Ivica Pajer (9 September 1934 – 17 August 2006) was a Yugoslavian-born Croatian actor. He is perhaps best known for portraying  David before he became a king in the 1960 film David and Goliath starring Orson Welles of which Pajer is credited as Ivo Payer. Pajer also had one of the major roles in The Road a Year Long, a 1958 Academy Award-nominated film directed by Giuseppe De Santis.

Filmography

References

Croatian male film actors
1934 births
2006 deaths
Yugoslav male film actors